The Embassy of Bulgaria in London is the diplomatic mission of Bulgaria in the United Kingdom. Diplomatic relations between the two countries date from 1879 and there has been a Bulgarian embassy in London since 1903. The embassy is currently housed in a building on the east side of Queen's Gate, just within the City of Westminster, which is Grade II listed.

References

External links
Official site

Bulgaria
Diplomatic missions of Bulgaria
Bulgaria–United Kingdom relations
Grade II listed buildings in the City of Westminster
South Kensington